Welsh Back is a wharf and street alongside the floating harbour in the centre of the city of Bristol, England. The wharf and street extend some  along the west side of the harbour between Bristol Bridge and Redcliffe Bridge. At the northern (Bristol Bridge) end, the street and wharf are immediately adjacent, but to the south they are separated by a range of single story transit sheds. The wharf is a grade II listed structure and takes its name because it was freqented by vessels from Welsh ports.

The Welsh Back has been an important quay since the 13th century, when it was located on the tidal course of the River Avon. In 1475, the merchant and benefactor Alice Chestre is recorded as having given a crane for use at the Welsh Back, this being the first evidence of a crane in the port of Bristol. The quayside was extended in 1724, and in 1809 the floating harbour was created by impounding the former river channel, meaning that boats could stay afloat at all states of the tide when alongside the quay. Today the Welsh Back is mostly the site of bars and restaurants, situated either in the buildings on the landward side of the street, or in boats moored alongside the quay.

The buildings on the landward side of the Welsh Back include the Granary, an imposing building in the Bristol Byzantine style. Just inland from the intersection of King Street and the Welsh Back is the historic Llandoger Trow public house, said to have inspired Robert Louis Stevenson in writing Treasure Island. Towards the northern end of Welsh Back is the so-called ‘bomb hole’, part of the quayside that was damaged by bombing during the Second World War and retained as a memorial. Alongside this is the Merchant Seamen’s memorial, commemorating those who lost their lives sailing from Bristol.

Location within Bristol harbour

References

External links
Bristol Floating Harbour heritage trail

Bristol Harbourside
Grade II listed buildings in Bristol
Streets in Bristol